Roland Moss Jr. (born September 20, 1946) is a former American football tight end who played for three seasons in the National Football League (NFL). He played college football for the Toledo Rockets football team.

Born in St. Matthews, South Carolina and raised in Passaic, New Jersey, Moss attended Passaic High School.

See also
List of Toledo Rockets in the NFL Draft

References

1946 births
Living people
People from St. Matthews, South Carolina
Sportspeople from Passaic, New Jersey
Players of American football from South Carolina
American football tight ends
Passaic High School alumni
Toledo Rockets football players
Baltimore Colts players
Buffalo Bills players
New England Patriots players
San Diego Chargers players